Earle Howard (September 6, 1926 – February 15, 2013) was an American law enforcement officer and legislator.

Biography
Born in Kokomo, Indiana, Howard served in the United States Army during World War II. He then worked for the Kokomo Police Department. Howard then worked for the Howard County, Indiana Sheriff Department and served as sheriff. Howard served in the Indiana House of Representatives 1986–1994.

Notes

1926 births
2013 deaths
People from Kokomo, Indiana
Indiana sheriffs
Members of the Indiana House of Representatives
United States Army personnel of World War II